Unty is a rural locality (a selo) in Shulaninsky Selsoviet, Gunibsky District, Republic of Dagestan, Russia. The population was 383 as of 2010.

Geography 
Unty is located 21 km south of Gunib (the district's administrative centre) by road. Shulani and Batsada are the nearest rural localities.

Nationalities 
Avars live there.

References 

Rural localities in Gunibsky District